In mathematics, a topological group  is called the topological direct sum of two subgroups  and  if the map 

is a topological isomorphism, meaning that it is a homeomorphism and a group isomorphism.

Definition

More generally,  is called the direct sum of a finite set of subgroups   of the map

is a topological isomorphism.

If a topological group  is the topological direct sum of the family of subgroups  then in particular, as an abstract group (without topology) it is also the direct sum (in the usual way) of the family

Topological direct summands

A the subgroup  is a topological direct summand if and only if the extension of topological groups

Examples

Suppose that  is a locally compact abelian group that contains the unit circle  as a subgroup. Then  is a topological direct summand of  The same assertion is true for the real numbers

See also

References

Topological groups
Topology